Scopula lehmanni is a moth of the family Geometridae. It is found on the Anatolian-Iranian heights, northern Israel and Jordan.

References

Moths described in 1991
lehmanni
Moths of Asia